Hibiscus tea is a herbal tea made as an infusion from crimson or deep magenta-colored calyces (sepals) of the roselle (Hibiscus sabdariffa) flower. It is consumed both hot and cold. It has a tart, cranberry-like flavor.

Consumption

Africa
The roselle hibiscus used to make the tea likely originated in Africa. In Africa, hibiscus tea is commonly sold in markets and the dried flowers can be found throughout West and East Africa. Variations on the drink are popular in West Africa and parts of Central Africa. In Senegal, bissap is known as the "national drink of Senegal". Hibiscus tea is often flavored with mint or ginger in West Africa. In Ghana it is known as "sobolo", and "zobo" in Nigeria.

Karkadé is served hot or chilled with ice. It is consumed in some parts of North Africa, especially in Egypt and Sudan. In Egypt and Sudan, wedding celebrations are traditionally toasted with a glass of hibiscus tea. On a typical street in central Cairo, many vendors and open-air cafés sell the drink.

In Sudan, people use hibiscus tea, or karkadé, in folk medicine to treat many health conditions.  Pharmaceutical researchers who have studied specimens from Sudan have suggested that its efficacy may relate to its anthocynanins, chemicals that can boost immune responses and combat inflammation, diabetes, cancer, and viral infections.

Americas

Agua de flor de Jamaica, also called agua de Jamaica and rosa de Jamaica, is popular in Mexico, Central America, and parts of South America and the Caribbean. It is one of several common aguas frescas, which are inexpensive beverages typically made from fresh juices or extracts. Jamaica and other aguas frescas are commonly found in taquerias or other Mexican restaurants. It is usually prepared by steeping the calyces, in boiling water, straining the mixture, pressing the calyces (to squeeze all the juice out), adding sugar, and stirring. It is served chilled, and in Jamaica, this drink is a tradition at Christmas, served with fruitcake or sweet potato pudding.

In Panama, both the flowers and the drink are called saril (a derivative of the English word sorrel). It is prepared by picking and boiling the calyces with chopped ginger, sugar, clove, cinnamon, and nutmeg. It is traditionally drunk around Christmas and Chinese New Year, diverging from Mexico and Central America and much more in line with the Caribbean, due to the strong West Indian influence in Panamanian culture especially in Panama City and most of Panama's Caribbean coast.

In the English-speaking Caribbean, the drink, called sorrel, is made from the calyces, and it is considered an integral part of Christmas celebrations. The Caribbean Development Company, a Trinidad and Tobago brewery, produces a Sorrel Shandy in which the tea is combined with beer.

In American soul food cuisine, hibiscus tea is included in a category of "red drinks" associated with West Africa and is commonly served in soul food restaurants and at African-American social events.

Southeast Asia
In Thailand, most commonly, roselle is prepared as a cold beverage, heavily sweetened and poured over ice, similar to sweetened fruit juices. Plastic bags filled with ice and sweetened 'grajeab' can be found outside of most schools and in local markets. It is less commonly made into a wine, sometimes combined with Chinese tea leaves, in the ratio of 4:1 by weight (1/5 Chinese tea). The beverage is consumed in Malaysia,  Cambodia and Indonesia as well.

Europe
In Italy, hibiscus tea, known as carcadè or karkadè (from the Arab word كَرْكَديه‎ [karkaˈdeː]), is usually consumed hot, often with the addition of sugar and lemon juice. First introduced from Eritrea, it was widely used as a tea substitute when the country was hit by trade sanctions for its invasion of Abyssinia. In other European countries, it is often as an ingredient in mixed herbal teas, (especially with malva flowers or rose hips in the mix, to enhance colouring), and as such, more commonly used than recognized.

Research 
Reviews have concluded that hibiscus tea consumption appears to modestly lower blood pressure in people with high blood pressure. Hibiscus tea was generally well tolerated, and did not adversely affect liver or kidney function at lower doses, but may be hepatotoxic at high doses.

References

Further reading

 Information about Roselle by J. Morton (1987), part of the New Crop Resource Online Program at Purdue University

Aguas frescas
Barbadian cuisine
Mexican drinks
Diabetes
Hypertension
Arabic drinks
African drinks
Italian drinks
Jamaican cuisine
Caribbean drinks
Panamanian cuisine
National dishes
Flower tea
Egyptian cuisine
Thai drinks
Malay cuisine
Cambodian drinks
Indonesian cuisine
Hibiscus